The 2015 Aragon motorcycle Grand Prix was the fourteenth round of the 2015 Grand Prix motorcycle racing season. It was held at the Ciudad del Motor de Aragón in Alcañiz on 27 September 2015.

In the MotoGP class, Marc Márquez took his seventh pole position of the season and broke his fastest lap qualifying record where he set the fastest lap record since 2014; with 1:46.645 — but he crashed out of the race on the second lap while pursuing Jorge Lorenzo, who was the winner. Second place was battled between Dani Pedrosa and Valentino Rossi, with Pedrosa eventually prevailing ahead of Rossi. Andrea Iannone, who was despite riding with his second time dislocated left shoulder, had qualified in third position, but he dropped into a fourth-place finish; lies 12 points behind Márquez for third position. Toni Elías, who previously replaced Karel Abraham (retired from the race due to foot injury) at 2015 Indianapolis Grand Prix, replacing Claudio Corti with Forward Racing; could only finish in twenty-first place. With Márquez retirement, Lorenzo and Rossi were on the podium; the Movistar Yamaha clinched the Teams Championship title; the first title since 2010.

Classification

MotoGP

Moto2
The first attempt to run the race was interrupted following an accident involving Dominique Aegerter and Xavier Siméon. For the restart, the race distance was reduced from 21 to 14 laps.

Moto3

Championship standings after the race (MotoGP)
Below are the standings for the top seven riders and constructors after round fourteen has concluded.

Riders' Championship standings

Constructors' Championship standings

Teams' Championship standings

 Note: Only the top seven positions are included for both sets of standings.

Notes

References

Aragon
Aragon Motorcycle Grand Prix
Aragon motorcycle Grand Prix
Aragon motorcycle Grand Prix